Sydney 28A  is a Mi'kmaq reserve located in Cape Breton County, Nova Scotia,  NE of Sydney.

It is a small reserve, unpopulated, of only 5.1 Hectares, and was established on 7 September 1921.

It is administratively part of the Membertou First Nation.

References

Indian reserves in Nova Scotia
Communities in Cape Breton County
Mi'kmaq in Canada